Bharat Chhikara sometimes Chikara (born 10 October 1985) is an Indian field hockey player who has played as a midfielder for the national team. He was part of the team that won the bronze medal at the 2010 Asian Games and silver medal at the 2010 Commonwealth Games. Chhikara is an alumnus of Jamia Millia Islamia University.

Chhikara played in 2019 for the institutional side Indian Oil Corporation (IOC).

References

External links
Player profile at indiahockey.net

1985 births
Living people
Indian male field hockey players
Field hockey players from Haryana
Commonwealth Games medallists in field hockey
Commonwealth Games silver medallists for India
Asian Games bronze medalists for India
Asian Games medalists in field hockey
Field hockey players at the 2010 Asian Games
Medalists at the 2010 Asian Games
Field hockey players at the 2010 Commonwealth Games
Jamia Millia Islamia alumni
2010 Men's Hockey World Cup players
Medallists at the 2010 Commonwealth Games